In cooking, reduction is the process of thickening and intensifying the flavor of a liquid mixture such as a soup, sauce, wine, or juice by simmering or boiling.

Reduction is performed by simmering or boiling a liquid such as a stock, fruit or vegetable juices, wine, vinegar, or a sauce until the desired concentration is reached by evaporation. This is done without a lid, enabling the vapor to escape from the mixture. Different components of the liquid will evaporate at slightly different temperatures, and the goal of reduction is to drive away those with lowest points of evaporation.

While reduction does concentrate the flavors left in the pan, reducing too much will drive away all liquid in the sauce, leaving a "sticky, burnt coating" on the pan.

Sauces from basic brown sauce to Béchamel sauce and even tomato sauce are simmered for long periods (from 1 to 10 hours) but not boiled. Simmering not only develops the maximum possible flavor, but also allows impurities to collect at the top and be skimmed off periodically as the sauce cooks. Boiling diffuses the impurities into the liquid and results in a bitter taste and unclear stock. Broths are also simmered rather than boiled, and for the same reasons.

Examples 
Common preparations involving reductions include:

 Consommés, reduced and clarified stocks
 Gravies
 Gastriques, sauces involving both acidic and sweet components
 Pan sauces
 Syrups

References

Cooking techniques
Culinary terminology